Konekham Inthammavong (born 10 July 1992 in Vientiane), is a Laotian football player, who plays as midfielder for Lao Toyota F.C. in Lao League. He is a member of Laos national football team who played at 2010 AFF Suzuki Cup.

References

External links 
 Profile
 

1992 births
Living people
Laotian footballers
People from Vientiane
Lao Toyota F.C. players
Laos international footballers
Association football midfielders